Chamaita ranruna is a moth of the subfamily Arctiinae first described by Shōnen Matsumura in 1927. It is found in China, Taiwan, Borneo and Japan.

The wingspan is 20–25 mm. Adults are on wing in May.

References

Moths described in 1927
Nudariina
Taxa named by Shōnen Matsumura